These are the official results of the Women's High Jump event at the 1995 IAAF World Championships in Gothenburg, Sweden. There were a total number of 38 participating athletes, with two qualifying groups and the final held on Sunday August 13, 1995.

Schedule
All times are Central European Time (UTC+1)

Results

Qualifying round
Held on Friday 1995-08-11

Qualification: Qualifying Performance 1.95 (Q) or at least 12 best performers (q) advance to the final.

Final

See also
 National champions high jump (women)
 1993 Women's World Championships High Jump
 1996 Women's Olympic High Jump
 1997 Women's World Championships High Jump

References
 Results
 IAAF
 Detailed results (p. 275)

H
High jump at the World Athletics Championships
1995 in women's athletics